Shipley Field at Bob "Turtle" Smith Stadium is a baseball stadium in College Park, Maryland.  It has served as the home field of the Maryland Terrapins baseball team at the University of Maryland since 1965. Shipley Field was formerly the home of the College Park Bombers of the Cal Ripken, Sr. Collegiate Baseball League, and was also used as a baseball venue by the Bowie Baysox during the 1994 season. The major league Washington Senators held a practice at Shipley Field on April 8, 1968, when their Opening Day game was postponed in the aftermath of the assassination of Martin Luther King Jr.

The stadium holds 2,500 people and opened in 1965.  It is named after former Maryland baseball coach, Burton Shipley. In 2004, a new artificial turf replaced an older turf installation in the stadium's infield, and improvements were made to the under field drainage system.

See also
 List of NCAA Division I baseball venues

References

External links
 

College baseball venues in the United States
Baseball venues in Maryland
Soccer venues in Maryland
Rugby union stadiums in the United States
Maryland Terrapins baseball
Maryland Terrapins sports venues